Sir Alagappa Chettiar (6 April 1909 – 5 April 1957) was an Indian businessman and philanthropist. He received the Padma Bhushan award (the third highest civilian award in India) in 1956.

Early life

Chettiar was born in Kottaiyur in the Sivaganga District of Tamil Nadu to K.V.AL. Ramanathan Chettiar and Umayal Achi. He attended Presidency College at Chennai, where he became friendly with Sarvepalli Radhakrishnan, a model teacher who later  became President of India. In 1930 at the age of 21 he was the first M.A. (English Language and Literature) from the community of Nattukottai Nagarathars.

After his graduation he went to England to study law. He qualified for the Bar at Middle Temple in England in 1933 and became a 'Bar-at-Law' in Chettinad. During that time he also earned a pilot certificate at Croydon, London, and became the first Indian trainee in the Standard Chartered Bank, London.

Business acumen

Chettiar's activities as a business entrepreneur were acknowledged by the British Government when he was knighted in the 1946 New Year Honours at the age of 37; however, he renounced using the title of the knighthood when India attained independence. The President of India on 26 January 1956 conferred the distinction of Padma Bhushan on him.

Chettiar launched his career by pioneering in textiles. In 1937 he started Cochin Textiles, later Alagappa Textiles at Alagappa Nagar near Thrissur in Kerala. The township for Cochin textile staff was named "Alagappa Nagar" in his memory. As a business savvy tycoon he practised diversification of portfolios with rubber plantations in Malaya, tin mines in Burma, textile mills in Kerala, insurance companies in Calcutta, hotels in Bombay, theatres in Madras, a flourishing stock exchange company and a private airline.

Philanthropy

Chettiar harboured a firm conviction that education is an absolute must for a human being to become productive, wholesome and humane. In 1943 he donated one lakh (100,000) rupees for the installation and development of the Tamil Department of Travancore University.

In 1947 at the Annie Besant centenary celebrations he answered the call for industrialists to help educate India by spontaneously offering to start an Arts College in Karaikudi. This college, Alagappa Arts College started at Gandhi Maleghai, opened three days later. His generous donations led to the establishment of a string of educational institutions, which formed the basis for the foundation of the Alagappa University in 1985 by the Government of Tamil Nadu.

He convinced Prime Minister Jawaharlal Nehru to house one of the Government's National Research Institutes in the heart of the Alagappa campus. At the inauguration of the Central Electro Chemical Research Institute (CECRI) on 14 January 1953, the then Vice-President of India Sarvepalli Radhakrishnan surmised 

Alagappa Chettiar pioneered the centre of excellence "A.C.College of Technology" (named after him) at Guindy, Chennai, which offers specialised Engineering & Technology courses including Chemical Technology, Petroleum Refining & Petrochemicals, Textile Engineering, Leather Technology, Industrial Biotechnology, Ceramic Technology, Pharmaceutical Technology, Food Technology, etc. Presently it comes under the governance of Anna University. His gave away his own palatial residence in Kottaiyur to start a women's college.

Notable donations and institutions 

His other foundations and charitable donations included:

Alagappa Chettiar College of Technology,(Now known as Alagappa College of Technology Campus- Anna University Chennai)
Alagappa Chettiar Government College of Engineering & Technology (ACCET) at Karaikudi, Tamil Nadu. (Now an autonomous government institution)
Alagappa Matriculation Higher Secondary School, Chennai, Tamil Nadu
Alagappa Arts College, Karaikudi, Tamil Nadu
Alagappa College of Polytechnic, Karaikudi, Tamil Nadu
Alagappa Physical Education College, Karaikudi, Tamil Nadu
Alagappa Primary School, Karaikudi, Tamil Nadu
Alagappa Montessori School, Karaikudi, Tamil Nadu
Alagappa Preparatory School, Karaikudi, Tamil Nadu (this is a private school managed by his daughter founded after him)
Alagappa Matriculation School, Karaikudi, Tamil Nadu (this is a private school managed by his daughter founded after him)
Alagappa Model Higher Secondary School at his birthplace, Karaikudi, Tamil Nadu
A ladies' hostel at Vepery, Chennai
A gift for the development of the township infrastructure of Kottaiyur
A gift for the Meenakshi club at Kandanur, Tamil Nadu
A donation for the H.M.I.S Fund
Foundation of an engineering college at Annamalai University, Chidambaram, Tamil Nadu
Foundation of a college of technology at Madras University, subsequently named Alagappa Chettiar College of Technology, Guindy, Chennai
A donation to establish higher education in Malaysia
A donation to establish the South Indian Educational Society at New Delhi in 1948
A donation to the Lady Doak College at Madurai
A donation for constructing "Alagappa Mandapam" at Thakkar Baba Vidyalaya in 1946 – the Foundation Stone was laid by M.K.Gandhi
A donation for publishing Tamil Kalangiyam
A donation to the Cochin Cyclone Relief fund
A donation for geological research by the Travancore government
A donation for establishing a maternity hospital and childcare centre in Cochin
A donation for indigenous medicine research by Ernakulam Maharaja College
A donation to fund students from Cochin to study abroad
Funding the morning food scheme for Cochin children
Establishing the South Indian chamber of commerce in Cochin

Death
At the age of 48, in the midst of single-handedly revolutionising his native town Karaikudi and changing the course of history, Chettiar succumbed to his illness. He was treated for cancer in 1955. After a brief recovery, his health worsened and died on 5 April 1957 at his residence in Vepery, Madras (now Chennai).

References

External links

http://www.alagappa.org/ Official Website,Alagappa Group of Educational Institutions 
http://www.alagappaalumni.com/ Official Website,Alagappa Global Alumni Association

1909 births
1957 deaths
Businesspeople from Tamil Nadu
Knights Bachelor
Indian Knights Bachelor
Recipients of the Padma Bhushan in social work
Indian businesspeople in textiles
20th-century Indian businesspeople
People from Sivaganga district
20th-century Indian philanthropists